Ahmed Idlibi is a Lebanese former basketball player. He led EuroBasket 1953 in scoring, averaging 15.9 points per game. His most notable performance was against Sweden, with a 34-point outburst. Idlibi was also a member of the Lebanese national team that finished seventh at EuroBasket 1949.

External links 
 FIBA.com Profile 
 Fibaeurope.com Profile

Living people
Lebanese men's basketball players
Year of birth missing (living people)